Turtling may refer to:
Turtling (sailing), a sailing term to describe the inverting of a dinghy
Turtling (hunting), the hunting of turtles
Turtling (gameplay), a game term to describe a defensive strategy
Turtling in climbing, when a climber is flipped during a fall

See also
Turtle (disambiguation)